Piervittorio Pampuro (22 April 1917 – 6 August 2007) was an Italian field hockey player. He competed in the men's tournament at the 1952 Summer Olympics.

References

External links
 

1917 births
2007 deaths
Italian male field hockey players
Olympic field hockey players of Italy
Field hockey players at the 1952 Summer Olympics
People from Terni
Sportspeople from the Province of Terni